Darryl Andrews is a South African jazz guitarist, composer, arranger and conductor. He has a BMus (Hon) degree from the University of Cape Town (UCT). He worked as a musical director/conductor at the South African Broadcasting Corporation (SABC) for four years, and has composed a body of jazz works that were later performed by the acclaimed concert group MJ9. Since 1977, he has directed the Darryl Andrews Big Band which is a 13-piece Latin ensemble of South African young and established jazz musicians. He has arranged and conducted music for many singers, musicals and concerts at venues such as the Baxter Theatre and the Nico in Cape Town.

In February 1993, he conducted the Cape Town Symphony Orchestra in an hour-long programme of original works. Since 2000, Andrews has performed regularly at jazz clubs throughout South Africa. He accepted a full-time post as lecturer in jazz at UCT in 1994 and has since been pursuing a doctorate in music composition and is active in performance and arranging in Cape Town.

Early life 
Growing up in South Africa during the apartheid era made it almost impossible for him to pursue a career in music and he eventually became a mechanical engineer. Since his heart was always in music he eventually left his job and worked hard to hone his musical skills while performing at hotels to make a living. He later formed a jazz group and worked for the SABC. He once said, "The message here for students and young people is to never give up. With passion and hard work, success can be yours no matter what the challenge."

Career 
Andrews played lead guitar in club bands like Missing Link, Big Daddy, Zig Zag, Makhoi, The Buttercups and Mahogany"in the early to mid-1970s. He then toured the international hotel circuit, honing his skills in reading and writing music. He returned to Cape Town in 1989 to form the groundbreaking jazz/funk band MJ9 and worked as musical director/composer/arranger at the SABC studios in Sea Point. In 1990, he conducted 62 performances of the hit musical Guys and Dolls at the Baxter Theatre after which he taught as a leave replacement to Andrew Lilley in the jazz studies programme at the UCT. He accepted a full-time post as lecturer in jazz studies, where he still teaches today. He has performed in Port Elizabeth, East London, Durban, Johannesburg, Lesotho, Swaziland, Botswana, Namibia, Mozambique, Ghana, Tanzania, Malaysia, Finland, Estonia, Germany and China and has worked with many international stars including Peter Sarstedt, Ben E. King, the Australian multi-instrumentalist James Morrison, the trumpeter John Thomas and Greg Philliganes, and is currently active as a guitarist, electric bass guitarist, composer, arranger and conductor.

Family
Andrews has three daughters, Nabeelah Jacobs, Sue-Ellen Petersen and Jamie-Lee November. He is the brother of Alicia Andrews, Alvin Andrews (former senior producer, Associated Press Television News in Johannesburg and head of the Mandela Unit, Thomson Reuters Television News, Johannesburg), Jemayne Andrews and Linford Andrews (former South African diplomat and head of the office of the Commonwealth Deputy Secretary-General at the Commonwealth Secretariat in London).

External links 
 Staff of South African College of Music
 https://sjpaderborn.wordpress.com/2011/12/27/all-that-jazz-with-darryl-andrews-aku-news/
 http://monroeblackhistory.wikispaces.com/Andrews,+Darrell
 

Living people
Year of birth missing (living people)
South African College of Music alumni
South African composers
South African male composers